ABP Ganga is a 24-hour Indian regional Hindi-language news channel for Uttar Pradesh and Uttarakhand. It is owned by ABP Group. The channel was launched on 15 April 2019.

See also
 ABP Group
 ABP News
 List of Indian television stations
 24-hour television news channels

References

External links
ABP News
ABP Majha
ABP Ananda
ABP SANJHA
ABP Asmita
Latest News Today, Breaking News & Top News Headlines

24-hour television news channels in India
Hindi-language television channels in India
Television channels and stations established in 2019
ABP Group